The First is a mountain of the Bernese Alps, overlooking Kandersteg in the canton of Bern.

Its summit can be reached by trail from Adelboden or Kandersteg.

References

External links
 First on Hikr

Mountains of the Alps
Mountains of Switzerland
Mountains of the canton of Bern
Two-thousanders of Switzerland